Numeri (Latin, 'numbers') may refer to:

 Book of Numbers, a book of the Hebrew Bible and the Torah
 Numeri (Roman troops), units of the Roman army

See also
 Numeria gens